Clinton College is a private historically black Christian college in Rock Hill, South Carolina. It is accredited by the Transnational Association of Christian Colleges and Schools.

History

It was founded as the Clinton Institute in 1894 and named after Bishop Caleb Isom Clinton of the African Methodist Episcopal Zion Church's Palmetto Conference. On June 22, 1909, it was incorporated as Clinton Normal and Industrial Institute after receiving authorization to grant state teacher certificates.

The school grew in the postwar era from the late 1940s into the 1960s and in 1965 the college changed its name to Clinton Junior College when the charter was amended to offer associate degrees.

In 2013, the college was renamed from Clinton Junior College to Clinton College after it received accreditation to become a four-year institution. The college added two bachelor programs, a Bachelor of Arts in Religious Studies and a Bachelor of Science in Business Administration.

Clinton College celebrated 125 years of higher education in 2019.

Academics
Clinton College offers several associate degree programs in business administration, early childhood development, liberal arts, natural sciences, and religious studies. The college added four-year programs in 2013 and now offers bachelor's degree programs in biology, business administration, and religious studies.

Athletics
Clinton College's athletic teams are known as the Golden Bears. The college competes as a dual member of the National Junior College Athletic Association (NJCAA) and the United States Collegiate Athletic Association (USCAA). Clinton fields men's and women's basketball teams and a cheerleading squad. The college is a founding member of the USCAA's Eastern Metro Athletic Conference (EMAC) in 2018. The Clinton College men's basketball team won the first EMAC championship on February 23, 2019, when they defeated Johnson & Wales University-Charlotte 77–75.

References

External links

Historically black universities and colleges in the United States
Private universities and colleges in South Carolina
Buildings and structures in Rock Hill, South Carolina
Education in York County, South Carolina
Transnational Association of Christian Colleges and Schools
NJCAA athletics